RMS Dunottar Castle was a Royal Mail Ship that went into service with the Castle Line (and its successor, the Union-Castle Line) in 1890 on the passenger and mail service between Britain and South Africa. In 1913 the ship was sold to the Royal Mail Steam Packet Company as the Caribbean. After the outbreak of the First World War she served as HMS Caribbean, first as a troop ship and then as an armed merchant cruiser, until she sank in a storm off the Scottish coast on 27 September 1915.

Construction and Service
The Dunottar Castle was built at Govan Shipyards in 1889 by the Fairfield Shipbuilding and Engineering Company for the Castle Line, passing to the Union Castle Line in 1900. She became famous in the 1890s for reducing the voyage from Southampton, England, to Cape Town, South Africa, from 42 to 17 days and 20 hours. In 1894 she grounded for two tides near the Eddystone Lighthouse. She was refitted in 1897 when the funnels were heightened, her yards were removed and she was given a wheelhouse.

Troop ship
In November 1899 Dunottar Castle was requisitioned as a troop ship in the Second Boer War. She carried General Redvers Buller and 1,500 troops to Cape Town for Boer War duties and on the following voyage carried Lord Roberts and Lord Kitchener. In the war she made frequent trips between Britain and the Cape Colony and carried some of the most famous Boer War warriors of the time, including two famous scouts, Major Frederick Russell Burnham and Col. Robert Baden-Powell, as well as a young war correspondent for the Morning Post by the name of Winston Churchill.

In 1904 Dunottar Castle was laid up at Netley in Southampton Water, but by 1907 she was being chartered to the Panama Railroad Co. for their New York to Colon (Panama Canal) service. In 1908 she was chartered to Sir Henry Lunn Ltd for cruises to Norway and the Mediterranean, and in 1911 she took guests to the Delhi Durbar of King George V.

Union-Castle became part of the Royal Mail Group in 1912, and Dunottar Castle was sold to the Royal Mail Steam Packet Company in 1913 as the Caribbean. In 1914 she was requisitioned as HMS Caribbean for World War I, initially as a troop ship to bring soldiers from Canada to Europe and later as an Armed Merchant Cruiser. But after it was found that she was unsuitable to carry gun mountings, she was converted into a dockyard workers' accommodation ship in May 1915.

Loss
Several ships were despatched to assist when her SOS message was received, but most were obliged to turn back due to the poor weather. Some trawlers from Stornoway and the light cruiser  managed to reach the scene. An attempt by the Birkenhead to place the Caribbean under tow failed, but most of the crew were rescued in the night.

The Caribbean sank early on 27 September, and the 15 crewmen still aboard died. The ensuing Court of Enquiry later blamed the ship's carpenter for being insufficiently familiar with the ship and for failing to shut all the scuttles. Like most of the crew, he had joined the ship just 10 days earlier. The wreck was found in 2004, undisturbed except for fishing nets.

Second Boer War milestones

3 July 1899, "at a few days" notice from Lord Wolseley, Col. Robert Baden-Powell left Southampton on Dunottar Castle and arrived in Cape Town on 25 July. On 10 October 1899 the Second Boer War began and three days later Baden-Powell was cut off by the Boers in the Siege of Mafeking
14 October 1899 Winston Churchill sailed from Southampton aboard Dunottar Castle and reached Cape Town on 31 October.
November 1899, General Redvers Buller and 1,500 troops were carried by Dunottar Castle to Cape Town to reinforce British Army forces at the start of the Second Boer War.
23 December 1899, Lord Roberts quickly departed Southampton on his way to South Africa on the Dunottar Castle where he took command of the British forces in the Second Boer War. En route, Lord Kitchener joined Lord Roberts on Dunottar Castle in Gibraltar to become the second in command.
 July 1900, Winston Churchill and Frederick Russell Burnham left South Africa and returned to England on 20 July as war heroes. On the voyage home, Churchill wrote the following letter to Cecil Rhodes:

In December 1900, her propeller shaft snapped and she had to be towed into Dakar. Galician went into service and in the same month went to Dakar to pick up passengers and mail from the disabled Dunottar Castle.

References

 

1890 ships
Ships built on the River Clyde
Ocean liners
Passenger ships of the United Kingdom
Second Boer War
Ships of the Union-Castle Line
Maritime incidents in 1894
Maritime incidents in 1915
World War I shipwrecks in the Atlantic Ocean
World War I Auxiliary cruisers of the Royal Navy